Guatraché is a town in La Pampa Province in Argentina.

History
Guatraché was officially founded on 19 April 1908 though a settlement already existed previously.  The town was settled to the east of the actual settlement, in front of the old railroad station, and due to subsequent floods the town was moved to where nowadays stands.  The list of surnames found in the town reveals the presence of immigrants coming from Spain, Italy, France and Germany, among other European countries.  Natives also participated in the early days of the settlement; however, their real names were hidden under a creole names and surnames.  Many of them came after being expelled in previous years by the militar campaigns while others came from distant places, joining the community as rural workers.

Guatraché is also home to one of the largest Mennonite communities in the country.

Climate

References

Populated places in La Pampa Province
Mennonitism in Argentina
Russian Mennonite diaspora in South America
La Pampa Province
Argentina
Cities in Argentina